CER-11 was a digital military computer, developed at Institute Mihajlo Pupin, located in Serbia, in a period between 1965-1966.

Overview
CER-11 was designed by prof.dr Tihomir Aleksic and prof.dr Nedeljko Parezanovic, along with their sci.associates ( M.Momcilovic, D.Hristovic, M.Maric, M.Hruska, P.Vrbavac et al). .
The computer was based on the transistor-diode logic circuitry and the paper tape equipments.
This digital computer was used in SFRY's Army JNA until 1988.

See also
 Tihomir Aleksic
 CER Computers
 Institute Mihajlo Pupin
 History of computer hardware in the SFRY

Further reading
 Dragana Becejski-Vujaklija, Nikola Markovic(Ed): "50 Years of Computing in Serbia (HRONIKA  DIGITALNIH  DECENIJA)", pp. 38, 56 and 76, DIS, IMP and PC Press, Belgrade 2011.
 Jelica Protic, D.Ristanovic: "Building Computers in Serbia", ComSYS, vol.8, No 3, pp 549–571, June 2011.
 V.Paunovic, D.Hristovic, "Review and analysis of  the CER computers", Proc.of the ETRAN-2000 Conference, pp. 79–82, Sokobanja June 2000. (In Serbian).
 Dusan Hristovic: "Razvoj računarstva u Srbiji" (Computing technology in Serbia),PHLOGISTON journal, No 18/19, pp. 89–105,  Museum MNT/SANU, Belgrade, 2010/2011.

CER computers
One-of-a-kind computers